Table tennis events at the 2013 Palarong Pambansa were held in Praxevilla Tennis Court, SU Tennis Center and YMCA. A total of eight events took place. Below are the winners.

Medal summary

Medal table

Elementary Division

Secondary Division

References

External links 
 2013 Palarong Pambansa official website
 2013 Palarong Pambansa Special Coverage by Rappler.com
Department of Education

2013
Palarong Pambansa
2013 Palarong Pambansa
Palarong